Mycetinis opacus is a species of agaric fungus first described in 1849 by Miles Joseph Berkeley and Moses Ashley Curtis as Marasmius opacus. Andrew Wilson and Dennis Desjardin transferred it to Mycetinis in 2005.

It is found in North America (and rarely in Japan) growing especially on dead Rhododendron material, but also on debris of oak, pine, and eastern hemlock.  The cap reaches only to about 2 cm diameter and it has conspicuous pale mycelial cords.  Unlike some other Mycetinis species, it does not smell of garlic.

References

Fungi described in 1849
Fungi of North America
opacus
Taxa named by Miles Joseph Berkeley